Eilema nigrociliata is a moth of the  subfamily Arctiinae that is known from South-West Madagascar.

The holotype of this species was collected in Andranohinaly, it is of yellow colour with some black spots/markings.

References

External links
 Swedish Museum of Natural History - picture of typus

Moths described in 1909
nigrociliata
Moths of Madagascar
Moths of Africa